The 8th Annual Gotham Independent Film Awards, presented by the Independent Filmmaker Project, were held on September 23, 1998, and were hosted by Stanley Tucci. At the ceremony, Sidney Lumet was honored with a Career Tribute, Frances McDormand received the Actor Award, Richard LaGravenese was given the Writer Award and David V. Picker was awarded the Producer/Industry Executive Award.

Winners and nominees

Breakthrough Actor
 Sonja Sohn – Slam (TIE) 
 Saul Williams – Slam (TIE) 
 Norman Reedus – Six Ways to Sunday
 Sam Rockwell – Lawn Dogs
 Robin Tunney – Niagara, Niagara

Breakthrough Director (Open Palm Award)
 Darren Aronofsky – Pi
 Lisa Cholodenko – High Art
 Chris Eyre – Smoke Signals
 Vincent Gallo – Buffalo '66
 Harmony Korine – Gummo

Actor Award
Frances McDormand

Writer Award
 Richard LaGravenese

Producer/Industry Executive Award
 David V. Picker

Career Tribute
 Sidney Lumet

References

External links
 

1998
1998 film awards